Boris Karlovich Pugo, OAN (19 February 1937 – 22 August 1991) was a Soviet Communist politician of Latvian origin.

Biography

Early life and education
Pugo was born in Kalinin, Russian SFSR (now Tver, Russia) into a family of Latvian communists who had left Latvia after Latvia was proclaimed an independent country in 1918 and the Communist side was defeated in the war that followed.  His family returned to Latvia after the Soviet Union occupied and annexed it in 1940.

Pugo graduated from Riga Polytechnical Institute in 1960 and worked in various Komsomol, Communist Party and Soviet government positions, both in Latvia and Moscow.

Party career
Pugo served in various positions between 1960 and 1984 including the first secretary of the Central Committee of the Komsomol of the Latvian SSR, a secretary of the Central Committee of Komsomol of the USSR, the First Secretary of the Riga City Committee of the Communist Party and chairman of the KGB in Latvia.

Pugo was the first secretary of the Communist Party of Latvia from 14 April 1984 to 4 October 1989. Pugo also served as chairman of the Control Commission of the Communist Party of the Soviet Union from 1989 to 1991.

In 1982, Pugo provided the case against  for a theft totaling 2,564 rubles of furniture, a telephone and other property from the Latvian Soviet Socialist Republic Communist Party which led to Luchansky being sentenced in 1983 to seven years in prison at the Jēkabpils zone prison.

Between 1990 and 1991, Pugo was the Minister of Interior Affairs of the USSR.

August Coup and death 
Pugo participated in the August Coup in 1991 and as the Minister of the Interior firmly supported measures to suppress opposition to the coup. After the coup had failed, Pugo committed suicide, anticipating arrest. He was contacted by the RSFSR prosecution for a meeting and he shot himself minutes after the phone call. His wife Valentina Ivanovna also committed suicide, although sources from the time were uncertain as to whether she killed herself or was killed by her husband.

Notes

References

External links

Pugo Boris Karlovich biography in Russian
 

1937 births
1991 suicides
Latvian communists
People from Tver
Russian people of Latvian descent
Heads of the Communist Party of Latvia
Politburo of the Central Committee of the Communist Party of the Soviet Union candidate members
People's commissars and ministers of the Soviet Union
State Committee on the State of Emergency members
Eleventh convocation members of the Soviet of Nationalities
Members of the Congress of People's Deputies of the Soviet Union
Members of the Supreme Soviet of the Latvian Soviet Socialist Republic, 1967–1971
Members of the Supreme Soviet of the Latvian Soviet Socialist Republic, 1971–1975
Members of the Supreme Soviet of the Latvian Soviet Socialist Republic, 1975–1980
Members of the Supreme Soviet of the Latvian Soviet Socialist Republic, 1980–1985
Members of the Supreme Soviet of the Latvian Soviet Socialist Republic, 1985–1990
Riga Technical University alumni
Recipients of the Order of Lenin
Recipients of the Order of the Red Banner of Labour
Recipients of the Order of the Red Star
Expelled members of the Communist Party of the Soviet Union
Suicides by firearm in the Soviet Union
Soviet politicians who committed suicide
Burials in Troyekurovskoye Cemetery